is a Japanese figure skater. She is the 2022 Skate Canada International champion and the 2022 CS Lombardia Trophy champion.

Personal life 
Watanabe was born on 19 July 2002 in Chiba. 

Watanabe learned to speak English from her time living and training in Vancouver.

Skating career

Early years 
Watanabe began figure skating at the age of three after watching Shizuka Arakawa win gold at the 2006 Winter Olympics on TV.

After winning the 2013 Japanese national novice B gold medal, she was invited to skate in the gala at the 2013 NHK Trophy. 

In 2017, Watanabe moved to Vancouver, Canada, after her longtime coach, Megumu Seki, moved from Chiba to coach there.

Given few international assignments in the early years of her junior career, she won the junior silver medal at the 2018 Bavarian Open and gold in the junior competition in the 2019 Coupe du Printemps.

Following the outbreak of the COVID-19 pandemic in 2020, the rink that Watanabe trained at in Vancouver closed down, forcing her to move her training back to Japan. Watanabe was briefly coached by Mie Hamada until a rink in her hometown of Chiba reopened in the spring of 2021. Kensuke Nakaniwa, Makoto Nakata, Momoe Naguma, and Aya Tanoue became her coaches.

2021–2022 season 
In her final season of international junior eligibility, Watanabe was not able to participate in the Junior Grand Prix because the Japan Skating Federation opted not to send singles skaters abroad in the fall. She finished sixth at the Japan Championships, earning international assignments for the second half of the season.

Watanabe competed in the junior division at the Bavarian Open, winning the silver medal and earning the technical minimums needed for the 2022 World Junior Championships. She then appeared at the Coupe du Printemps at the senior level, winning gold, before placing tenth at the World Junior Championships to conclude the season.

2022–2023 season 

Watanabe began the season by making her Challenger series debut at the 2022 CS Lombardia Trophy, where she unexpectedly won the gold over reigning World and Japanese champion Kaori Sakamoto. She also cleared the 200-point threshold for the first time internationally.

Following her success at the Lombardia Trophy, she was selected to replace Wakaba Higuchi at both of her Grand Prix assignments when the latter withdrew due to an injury. Making her Grand Prix debut at the 2022 Skate Canada International, she was considered a favourite going in but placed sixth in the short program due to rotation issues on some triple jumps. She rebounded in the free skate, winning that segment and taking the gold medal. Watanabe was pleased afterward, noting, "this is my first time at the Grand Prix, and I did pretty good. I was very nervous. I was told only one week ago that I would participate, and it was hard to adjust my training." Following her win, she entered the 2022 NHK Trophy as a podium favourite but ran into trouble in the short program, where she fell on her triple Axel attempt and then singled an intended triple loop. As a result, she placed ninth in the segment, almost ten points behind third-place Rion Sumiyoshi. She rallied in the free skate, landing a slightly underrotated triple Axel and placing third in that segment, and rose to fifth overall, 5.05 points behind bronze medalist Sumiyoshi.

Watanabe's results on the Grand Prix qualified her for the Grand Prix Final in Torino, one of three Japanese women attending, alongside Kaori Sakamoto and Mai Mihara. She finished fourth in the short program after her triple Axel attempt was called a quarter underrotated. In a "turbulent" free skate segment that saw many skaters underperform markedly, Watanabe finished third in that segment and very narrowly fourth overall, only 0.34 points behind bronze medalist Loena Hendrickx of Belgium. Assessing the Final, she said she "liked the overall experience and hope to come back to another.

Watanabe struggled in the short program of the 2022–23 Japan Championships, coming eighteenth in that segment. She rose to twelfth place after the free skate. Despite this poor showing at the national championship, her international results earned her assignments to the 2023 Four Continents and 2023 World Championships.

At the Four Continents Championship in Colorado Springs, errors saw Watanabe place eighth in the short program. In the free skate, she was one of only three skaters to attempt a triple Axel, and the only one to land it cleanly, though she made errors on both attempted triple Lutz jumps. Fourth in that segment, she moved up to fifth overall.

Programs

Competitive highlights 
GP: Grand Prix; CS: Challenger Series

Seasons: 2017–18 to present

Seasons: 2012–13 through 2016–17

Detailed results

References

External links 
 
 

2002 births
Living people
Japanese female single skaters
Sportspeople from Chiba Prefecture
21st-century Japanese women